Ronald E. Burton (July 25, 1936 – September 13, 2003) was an American football player in the American Football League (AFL) for the Boston Patriots. He was a consensus All-American running back at Northwestern University, and is a member of the Northwestern Hall of Fame and College Football Hall of Fame.

Playing career

Northwestern Wildcats
Burton was a star on Ara Parseghian's late 1950s Northwestern Wildcats football teams.  Named all-Big Ten in 1958 and 1959, and All-America in 1959, Burton left Northwestern having broken school records for most points in a career (130), most points in a season (76), most touchdowns in a career (21).  Burton led Northwestern in all-purpose yards in 1957, 1958, and 1959. Burton finished 10th in the 1959 Heisman Trophy balloting.

Boston Patriots
Burton was the Boston Patriots' first-ever American Football League draft choice in 1960. He was the first Patriot to rush for over 100 yards: 127 against the Denver Broncos on October 23, 1960, as well as numerous other firsts for the Patriots.  His 91-yard touchdown return on a missed field goal in 1962 remains a Patriot record. He compiled 1,009 combined yards in rushing and receiving in 1962, and provided strong depth at running back for the Patriots from 1960 through 1965.

Statistics: 
Ron Burton Sr.
New England (Boston) Patriots 1960-1965

All-Time Leader in Punt Returns(Based on return yardage)Years: 1960-’65 NO: 56 FC: 0 YDS: 389AVG: 6.9 LG 62 TD: 0

Year-by-Year Leader in Punt ReturnsYear: 1965 NO: 15 YDS: 61 AVG: 4.1 LG 12 TD: 0

Year-by-Year Leader in RushingYear: 1962 ATT: 134 YDS: 548 AVG: 4.0 LG: 59 TD: 2

Personal life
His sons are Ron Burton Jr., a director of community relations for the Red Sox, Paul Burton, a reporter for WBZ-TV, and Steve Burton who is the Sports Director for WBZ-TV in Boston and a frequent guest on WEEI-FM sports radio. His granddaughter, Veronica, plays basketball for the Dallas Wings of the Women's National Basketball Association (WNBA).

In 2003, Burton died from multiple myeloma. At the time of his death, he was living in Framingham, Middlesex County, Massachusetts.

See also
 List of American Football League players

References

External links
 https://www.ronburtontrainingvillage.org/about/ron-burton-sr

1936 births
2003 deaths
American football running backs
Boston Patriots players
Northwestern Wildcats football players
All-American college football players
College Football Hall of Fame inductees
College football announcers
Sportspeople from Springfield, Ohio
Sportspeople from Framingham, Massachusetts
Deaths from cancer in Massachusetts
Deaths from multiple myeloma
Players of American football from Ohio